Daniel Gimeno-Traver won the title for the third year in a row, defeating Stéphane Robert 6–4, 7–6(7–2)

Seeds

Draw

Finals

Top half

Bottom half

References
 Main Draw
 Qualifying Draw

Copa Sevilla singles
Singles
2013 ATP Challenger Tour